Crvena Hrvatska ('Red Croatia') was a weekly Croatian Party of Rights political newspaper that spread the ideology of Ante Starčević in Dubrovnik, Dalmatia and that existed in 1890–1899 Austria-Hungary.

See also
Frano Supilo
Red Croatia

Sources
 "Crvena Hrvatska" at proleksis.lzmk.hr 

Defunct newspapers published in Croatia
Mass media in Dubrovnik
Weekly newspapers published in Croatia
Newspapers established in 1890
Publications disestablished in 1899
1890 establishments in Austria-Hungary
1899 disestablishments in Austria-Hungary